Phan Thanh Bình (born November 1, 1986) is a retired Vietnamese footballer who played as a striker. He was a member of the Vietnam national football team.

International goals

Vietnam U-23

Vietnam

References

External links 

1986 births
Living people
Vietnamese footballers
Hoang Anh Gia Lai FC players
V.League 1 players
Vietnam international footballers
2007 AFC Asian Cup players
People from Đồng Tháp Province
Association football forwards
Footballers at the 2006 Asian Games
Dong Thap FC players
Southeast Asian Games silver medalists for Vietnam
Southeast Asian Games medalists in football
Competitors at the 2003 Southeast Asian Games
Competitors at the 2005 Southeast Asian Games
Competitors at the 2009 Southeast Asian Games
Asian Games competitors for Vietnam